The Botanical Garden at the Sorgenti del Cavuto  is a botanical garden in Anversa degli Abruzzi,  province of L'Aquila, Abruzzo, central-southern Italy. The garden was established in 1999, and is managed by the municipality of  Anversa degli Abruzzi  in agreement with the World Wide Fund for Nature. It contains about 380 native plant species, of which 45 are classified as endangered.

The Botanical Garden is the latest offshoot of the Riserva delle Gole del Sagittario near Anversa degli Abruzzi. The Botanical Garden is accessed is through a descent from Anversa degli Abruzzi.

The Sorgenti del Cavuto flow directly into the river Sagittario, the main tributary of the Aterno-Pescara. The garden has an irrigated nursery whose water is provided by the Sagittario and the Sorgenti del Cavuto. These rivers also feed a power plant.

See also 
 List of botanical gardens in Italy

References

Sources

External links 
 Abruzzo e Appennino description (Italian)
 Abruzzo Region tourist description (Italian)
 Index Seminum, Giardino Botanico delle Gole del Sagittario (Italian)

Botanical gardens in Italy
Gardens in Abruzzo
Anversa degli Abruzzi